Jaan Kolberg (born 21 November 1958) is an Estonian film director and producer.

Jaan Kolberg was born in Pärnu, where he attended primary and secondary schools. In 1976, he enrolled at Tartu State University, majoring in English. While at university, from 1977 until 1979, he participated as an actor at Evald Hermaküla's stage studio at the Vanemuine theatre. After graduating from Tartu State University, Kolberg studied filmmaking at the All-Union State Institute of Cinematography (VGIK) in Moscow from 1985 until 1990. 

In 1991, he married actress Terje Pennie.  In 2003 he established the production company Tristan (later Navona).

Filmography

 2018: "Vello Salo. Igapäevaelu müstika" (documentary film)
 2020 "Hüvasti, NSVL" (feature film)

References

Living people
1958 births
Estonian film directors
Estonian documentary filmmakers
Estonian film producers
University of Tartu alumni
People from Pärnu